Złotów  is a village in the administrative district of Gmina Zawonia, within Trzebnica County, Lower Silesian Voivodeship, in southwestern Poland. Prior to 1945, it was located in Germany.

References

Villages in Trzebnica County